The 1961–62 Mexican Segunda División was the 12th season of the Mexican Segunda División. The season started on 17 June 1961 and concluded on 14 January 1962. It was won by UNAM.

Changes 
 Nacional was promoted to Primera División.
 Celaya was relegated from Primera División.
 Cruz Azul and Veracruz joined the league.
 Cuautla, Querétaro, Salamanca, San Luis, Valladolid and Vasco de Quiroga have dissolved.

Teams

League table

Results

References 

1961–62 in Mexican football
Segunda División de México seasons